Rarities is the third compilation album by UK-based pop-rock project Shakespears Sister, released in January 2012 exclusively through on digital format through their website.

Background 
Rarities holds true to its title, consisting of rare and unreleased tracks, several exclusive to the album, even a cover of "Venus" by Bananarama, recorded by Siobhan Fahey as a backing track for live performances. Although described by the act as "an updated download package of The Red Room Sessions", only two tracks from The Red Room Sessions are included on here.

Track listing

References 

2012 compilation albums
Shakespears Sister albums